The National Photographic Archive (Irish: Cartlann Grianghrafadóireachta Náisiúnta) is located in Temple Bar in Dublin, Ireland, and holds the photographic collections of the National Library of Ireland (NLI). The archive was opened in 1998, and has a reading room and exhibition gallery. The gallery's exhibition space hosts photographic exhibitions – often relating to the NLI's collections.

See also
National Library of Ireland

References

External links
National Photographic Archive

Library buildings completed in 1998
1998 establishments in Ireland
Archives in the Republic of Ireland
Ireland
Libraries in Dublin (city)
National museums of the Republic of Ireland
Photography museums and galleries in the Republic of Ireland
Photography in Ireland
Museums in Dublin (city)
Art museums established in 1998